Björk was an exhibition at the Museum of Modern Art (MoMA) about the Icelandic singer of the same name.

Background and development
On June 12, 2014, it was announced that the Biophilia apps were to be featured as part of the permanent collection of the Museum of Modern Art in New York, thus becoming the first app to be part of the museum collection. A week later, the museum announced that a retrospective exhibition of the singer's work will take place starting on March 7, 2015 until June 7, 2015.

Description
Björk is curated by the director of MoMA PS1, Klaus Biesenbach, who commented on the exhibition: "Björk is an extraordinarily innovative artist whose contributions to contemporary music, video, film, fashion, and art have had a major impact on her generation worldwide, this highly experimental exhibition offers visitors a direct experience of her hugely collaborative body of work".

The exhibit incorporated a new commission from MoMA which saw Björk reunited with award-winning video director Andrew Thomas Huang ("Mutual Core") presenting a brand new work. In addition elements from her previous seven studio albums (excluding her 1977 juvenilia work Björk) and her multiple collaborations with fashion designers, video directors and photographers  were presented as a mid career 'Retrospective'. Childhood friend, theatrical director and acclaimed actress Margrét Vilhjálmsdóttir and lyrical collaborator esteemed Icelandic poet Sjón have contributed to a highly original Acousmatic Sound audio narrative for visitors to the exhibit.

See also
 2015 in art

References

External links
 

2015 in New York City
Björk
Museum of Modern Art (New York City) exhibitions